"Hold Me Tight or Don't" (stylised in all caps) is a song by American rock band Fall Out Boy, released on November 15, 2017, through Island Records and DCD2. It was released as the fourth single from their seventh studio album, Mania. A music video was released with the single.

"Hold Me Tight or Don't (The Remixes)" was released on April 13, 2018, featuring three remixes of the song.

Composition  
"Hold Me Tight or Don't" was written in the key of E major with a vocal range of E4 to C♯6.

Al Shipley of Spin called the song "trendy trop house", while also comparing it to reggae. Dave Simpson of The Guardian described the song as a "Shakira-type Europop wobbler". The Musical Hype has described the song, particularly the lyrical content, as emo.

Music video
The music video was directed by Brendan Walter and Mel Soria. It is set on Día de Muertos and features the band performing in the festival. The video also has a romantic subplot between a woman, dressed in traditional Day of the Dead costume, and a man wearing a skull mask. The San Gabriel Mission Museum is visible in the background, implying the video was filmed in San Gabriel, California.

Reception
Maeve McDermott of USA Today called the song a "lazy attempt" at tropical house music, while Hannah Mylrea of NME felt that it as a "chiming tropical jam".

Track listing

Personnel
Fall Out Boy
 Patrick Stump – vocals, rhythm guitar, keyboards, percussion, songwriting, production, engineering
 Pete Wentz – bass guitar, songwriting, production
 Joe Trohman – lead guitar, keyboards, songwriting, programming, production, engineering
 Andy Hurley – drums, percussion, songwriting, production
Production
 Jonny Coffer - programming, keyboards, songwriting
 Butch Walker - engineering
 Todd Stopera - engineering
 Mark "Spike" Stent - mixing engineer

Charts

Weekly charts

Year-end charts

Release history

References

2017 songs
2017 singles
Fall Out Boy songs
Songs written by Patrick Stump
Songs written by Pete Wentz
Songs written by Joe Trohman
Songs written by Andy Hurley
Songs written by Jonny Coffer
Island Records singles